Arbor is an unincorporated community in Cape Girardeau County, in the U.S. state of Missouri.

History
A post office called Arbor was established in 1884, and remained in operation until 1928. The community most likely was named for a brush arbor near the original town site.

In 1925, Arbor had 83 inhabitants.

References

Unincorporated communities in Cape Girardeau County, Missouri
Unincorporated communities in Missouri